N v United Kingdom [2008] ECHR 453 is an ECHR human rights case, concerning the lawfulness of deporting an individual in the UK with serious health issues.

Facts
A Ugandan citizen with HIV/AIDS claimed deportation to Uganda would be inhuman and degrading under ECHR article 3, because she would be unlikely to get health treatment. Without treatment she would stay alive for 2 years, with treatment for decades, almost as normal.

The House of Lords [2005] UKHL 31 agreed her case was not sufficiently exceptional, to justify halting deportation.

Judgment
The European Court of Human Rights agreed with the House of Lords that the case was not exceptional, in contrast to the case of D v United Kingdom (1997) 24 EHRR 423.

See also

United Kingdom enterprise law

Notes

References

United Kingdom enterprise case law